Here is a list of places on Earth, based on specific categories.

General lists of places

Lists of countries 
List of countries by name, by capital, by government.

by area
by continent
by country code
Federal Information Processing Standard (FIPS) two-letter
International Olympic Committee (IOC) three-letter
Internet TLDs
ISO 3166-1 two and three-letter
ITU country calling numbers
by name
by national capital
by official language
by population
by population density
by time zone
List of oil-producing states
List of flags
List of regions
List of territorial disputes
List of active autonomist and secessionist movements 
Dependent areas
List of dependent territories
List of subnational entities
Table of administrative country subdivisions by country
Pseudo-states
List of extinct countries, empires, etc.
List of micronations

Cities 
List of city listings by country
Capitals
List of national capitals by name (present and past)
List of capitals and larger cities by country
List of current and former capital cities within U.S. states
List of metropolitan areas by population
List of the world's most populous cities
List of cities in India
List of planned cities
List of city nicknames in the United States
List of towns
List of places in London
List of Brooklyn, New York neighborhoods
List of Manhattan, New York neighborhoods
List of urban studies topics
List of named ethnic enclaves in North American cities

List of sites 
Ecclesiastic
List of abbeys and priories
Ireland
England
Scotland
Wales
Northern Ireland
Isle of Man
List of cathedrals
List of churches and cathedrals of London
List of Shinto shrines
Secular
List of aquaria
List of botanical gardens
List of buildings
List of largest suspension bridges
List of castles
Lists of cemeteries by country
List of reservoirs and dams
List of gardens
List of historic houses
List of hospitals
List of museums
List of museum ships
List of Japanese landmarks
List of public outdoor clothes free places
List of skyscrapers
Tall buildings in London
Tall buildings in Melbourne
List of spa towns
List of United States military bases
List of mean centers of U.S. population during the 20th century
List of walls
List of waterfalls
List of World Heritage Sites
List of zoos

Man-made geographical features 
 List of buildings
 List of countries
 List of extinct countries, empires, etc.
 List of cities
 Twin cities 
 Twin towns 
 Sister cities
 List of national capitals
 List of historical national capitals
 List of schools

Natural geographical features 
 List of impact craters
 List of mountains
 List of rivers
 List of waterways
 List of waterfalls

Lists of places in a country 
 List of places in Belarus
 List of places in Cuba
 List of places in Germany
 List of places in Iraq
 List of places in the Netherlands
 List of places in the United Kingdom
 List of places in the United States

Lists of places in a state or city 
Victoria, Australia:
List of localities (Victoria), Local government areas of Victoria, and Counties of Victoria
List of Melbourne suburbs

Lists of places by name etymology 
 List of places named after people
List of things named after Queen Anne
List of places named for Lewis Cass
List of places named for DeWitt Clinton
List of places named for Christopher Columbus
List of places named for the Marquis de Lafayette
List of places named after Saint Francis
List of places named for Benjamin Franklin
List of places named for Charles de Gaulle
List of places named for Pope John Paul II
List of places named for Nathanael Greene
List of places named for Sam Houston
List of places named for Andrew Jackson
List of places named for Thomas Jefferson
List of things named after Tadeusz Kościuszko
List of places named after Lenin
List of places named for James Madison
List of places named for Francis Marion
List of places named for James Monroe
List of places named for Richard Montgomery
List of places named for James K. Polk
List of places named for Israel Putnam
List of places named after Stalin
List of places named after Tito
List of places named after Queen Victoria
List of places named for George Washington
 List of places named after peace
 List of non-US places that have a US place named after them

Other lists of places 
 List of chemical elements named after places
 List of places with 'Silicon' names
 List of research parks
 List of political and geographic subdivisions by total area
 List of short place names
 List of long place names

Extraterrestrial features/regions 
List of mountains on Venus
List of mountains on Mars
List of mountains on Io
List of craters on Venus
List of craters on Mars
List of craters on Europa
List of craters on Ganymede
List of craters on Callisto
Phobos (moon)#Named geological features
Deimos (moon)#Named geological features
List of valleys on the Moon

See also 

 Lists of things named after places